The Root of All Evil is a Japan-only EP release by the all-female tribute band The Iron Maidens. It includes three new cover recordings of Iron Maiden songs and a dance remix of "The Trooper." This was the band's last recording to feature lead vocalist Aja Kim and guitarists Sara Marsh and Heather Baker, who left the band.

Unlike their previous albums, the EP is not offered on the band's official website.

Prior to the release of the EP, the band first performed the acoustic version of "Different World" on the Los Angeles, CA, radio station 97.1 KLSX in late 2007.

Track listing

 "Transylvania" (Steve Harris) - 4:21
 "The Evil That Men Do" (Bruce Dickinson, Adrian Smith, Harris) - 4:29
 "Different World" (Acoustic Version) (Smith, Harris) - 4:02
 "The Trooper" (Dance Remix) (Harris) - 4:41
 Remixed by Glenn Baren and Lynn Woolever

Personnel
Aja Kim (a.k.a. Bruce Lee Chickinson) – lead vocals
Sara Marsh (a.k.a. Mini Murray) – lead guitar, acoustic guitar (track 3)
Heather Baker (a.k.a. Adrienne Smith) – rhythm guitar, acoustic guitar (track 3), backing vocals
Wanda Ortiz (a.k.a. Steph Harris) – bass
Linda McDonald (a.k.a. Nikki McBurrain) – drums

Credits
Derek Riggs - CD Cover Design
Linda McDonald - CD Sleeve/Tray Layout, CD Cover Design
Ernie Manrique - Photography
RJ Blaze - Back Tray Artwork ("Evil Root Edwina")

References

External links 
 The Iron Maidens - "Different World" (Unplugged Live at 97.1 KLSX-FM)
 The Iron Maidens - "The Trooper" (Dance Remix) (unofficial video featuring Initial D)

2008 EPs
The Iron Maidens albums